Eda Kersey (15 May or 16 May 190413 July 1944) was a British violinist who was renowned for her brilliant playing.  She premiered a number of important works, including the Bax Violin Concerto, but her career was cut short by her early death.

Eda Kersey was born in Goodmayes, Essex in 1904. She studied the violin from the age of six, winning an honours certificate from the Trinity College of Music when only eight.  She studied with Edgar Mouncher, a pupil of Otakar Ševčík; under him, she prepared the first movement from Wieniawski's Violin Concerto No. 2 in D minor, which she played in Southampton when only ten.  At 13, she commenced studies with Margaret Holloway, a pupil of Leopold Auer. She gave her first London recital at age 16 at the Aeolian Hall. The BBC engaged her to play the Mendelssohn, Beethoven and Elgar concertos and she gave the first broadcast of Dohnányi's Violin Concerto No. 1.  She also performed the Beethoven concerto at the 1930 Proms under Sir Henry J. Wood.  Later Proms performances included the Brahms and Bach A minor concertos.

In 1930 she gave the first two performances of Stanley Wilson's Violin Concerto in the Midlands and a further performance in Bournemouth on 3 April, 1930.

In 1931 she formed a piano trio with Gerald Moore and Cedric Sharpe, while continuing her solo career.  She also played in a trio with Howard Ferguson and Helen Just for some time.

She became friendly with Albert Sammons, who encouraged her to overcome her dislike of the Elgar concerto and include it in her repertoire.  She preferred works such as the violin sonatas of John Ireland, which she played with Kathleen Long.  Her repertoire also included the Violin Concerto by Ernest Bloch.

Eda Kersey premiered Arthur Benjamin's Romantic Fantasy on 24 March 1938, with violist Bernard Shore, at a Royal Philharmonic Society concert conducted by the composer.

During World War II, she gave many performances for CEMA. She and Kathleen Long were regular artists at Dame Myra Hess's National Gallery Lunchtime Concerts.

Eda Kersey also premiered E.J. Moeran's Violin Sonata, and gave the UK premiere of Samuel Barber's Violin Concerto at a 1943 Proms concert.  In 1938, Arnold Bax had written his Violin Concerto for Jascha Heifetz, but Heifetz did not find it sufficiently challenging and never played it, so Bax put it aside.  The work was given its premiere on 22 November 1943 by Eda Kersey and the BBC Symphony Orchestra under Sir Henry Wood, after Arthur Bliss, then the BBC's Director of Music, commissioned Bax to write a new work.  She also recorded the concerto in February 1944, under Sir Adrian Boult.

Preparations to record some of the core concerto repertoire were well advanced when she died. Her death, from stomach cancer, occurred on 13 July 1944, at the age of 40.  Elsie Suddaby sang at her memorial service.

Eda Kersey's recordings are few: they include the Bax Concerto and pieces by Brahms, Fritz Kreisler and Jenő Hubay.  The Eda Kersey Memorial Exhibition was created in 1947 at the Royal Academy of Music.

References 

1904 births
1944 deaths
British classical violinists
Deaths from stomach cancer
20th-century classical violinists
20th-century British musicians
Women classical violinists
20th-century British  women musicians